Henriëtte Knip may refer to
 Henriëtte Geertruida Knip, Dutch flower painter
 Henriëtte Ronner-Knip, Dutch painter and her niece